RTL 5 is a Dutch free-to-cable television channel that was launched on 2 October 1993. It mainly broadcasts American films and hit series but also reality shows, comedy, travel, international shows and local productions including Expeditie Robinson, Holland's Next Top Model & Benelux' Next Top Model, Dutch versions of America's Next Top Model, Dutch version of Project Catwalk, So You Think You Can Dance and a Dutch version of ITV's Take Me Out.

Officially RTL 5 - along with RTL 4, RTL 7 and RTL 8 - is headquartered in Hilversum, broadcasting with a Luxembourg TV license. This allows them to avoid more severe control by the Dutch media authorities as Luxembourg's television watchdog is less strict.

History

RTL 5 started as RTL V via the Astra 1C satellite on 2 October 1993. The programming mainly consists of shows about cars and programmes for men. In 1994 it changed the Roman number V into 5. In 1995 Veronica joined RTL 4 S.A., starting a joint venture called HMG (Holland Media Groep), and with three major channels RTL could disrupt the television market in the Netherlands. Therefore, under pressure of the European Commission the channel was rebranded as RTL 5 Nieuws & Weer (in English: RTL 5 News & Weather) between 1997 and 1998. RTL 5 became a thematic news channel. In 2001 the European Commission reversed the restrictions for RTL 5 because competitive channels had been launched in the Netherlands. In 2001 a Business and Financial News block called RTL Z started on RTL 5 during daytime. RTL Z moved from RTL 5 to RTL 7 on 12 August 2005. Since 2005 RTL 5 has become a 24-hours channel.

Series and shows currently shown
Ambulance
Ambulance Australia
Big Brother
Big Brother Australia (from series 12)
Bondi Vet
Dr. Phil
Expeditie Robinson
Gordon Ramsay's 24 Hours to Hell and Back
Holland's Next Top Model
RTL De Journal

Series and shows previously shown or on hiatus
'Allo 'Allo!
18 Wheels of Justice
21 Jump Street
24
24: Live Another Day
ALF
A.U.S.A.
Adam Zkt. Eva
Age of Love
Airwolf
Alarm für Cobra 11 – Die Autobahnpolizei
Aliens in America
America's Next Top Model
American Horror Story
Australia's Next Top Model
Babylon 5
Bad Girls Club
Balls of Steel
Beauty and the Geek
Benelux' Next Top Model
Biker Mice from Mars
Bionic Woman
Bodyshockers
Bones
Breaking Bad
Breakout Kings
Britain's Missing Top Model
Britain's Next Top Model
Burn Notice
Cashmere Mafia
Celebrity Rehab with Dr. Drew
Chuck
C.O.P.S
Crossing Lines
CSI: Crime Scene Investigation
CSI: Cyber
CSI: Miami
CSI: NY
Dames in de Dop (Ladette to Lady)
Dangerous Curves
Days of Our Lives
Degrassi: The Next Generation
Dharma & Greg
Dollhouse
Don't Trust the B---- in Apartment 23
Drop Dead Diva
Everybody Loves Raymond
Friends
Game of Thrones
Glee
Gossip Girl
Greek
Grimm
Hannibal
Helicopter Heroes
Heroes
Hidden Palms
Hotter Than My Daughter
House
How I Met Your Mother
Huge
Human Target
Idols
Jensen!
Kitchen Nightmares
Kyle XY
In Plain Sight
Ink Master
Impractical Jokers
Janice & Abbey
Ladette to Lady
Las Vegas
Last Man Standing
Late Show with David Letterman
LAX
Leverage
Lie to Me
Life
Life Unexpected
Lipstick Jungle
Make It or Break It
MasterChef
MasterChef Australia
Melissa & Joey
Mercy
Mighty Morphin Power Rangers
Mijn Tent is Top (My Restaurant Rules) (moved to RTL 4)
Modern Family
Motive
My Name Is Earl
New Girl
NewsRadio
Oz
Paradise Hotel
Passion Cove
Past Life
Point Pleasant
Pretty Little Liars
Project Catwalk
Project Runway
Prison Break
Raising Hope
Renegade
Robin Hood
Robson Arms
Rock School
Royal Pains
Rude Tube
Running in Heels
Saving Grace
Secret Diary of a Call Girl
Seinfeld
Sleepy Hollow
Smash
So You Think You Can Dance
So You Think You Can Dance: The Next Generation
So You Think You Can Dance USA
Spartacus
Star Wars: The Clone Wars
Stingers
Suits
Survival of the Richest
Tabatha Takes Over
Terra Nova
Terriers
The Americans
The Benny Hill Show
The Blacklist
The Blacklist: Redemption
The Cosby Show
The Ellen DeGeneres Show
The Event
The Fashion Show
The Glades
The Golden Cage
The Inside
The Janice Dickinson Modeling Agency
The King of Queens
The L Word
The Millionaire Matchmaker
The Nanny
The Phone
The Rachel Zoe Project
The Secret Life of the American Teenager
The Simple Life
The Sketch Show
The Strip
The Tribe
The Tyra Banks Show
The Ultimate Dance Battle
The Unit
The Unusuals
The Vampire Diaries
Third Watch
Transporter: The Series
Trauma
Treasure Hunters
True Beauty
True Blood
True Jackson, VP
Tyrant
Van etter tot engel (Brat Camp)
Vijf tegen Vijf (Family Feud)
White Collar
Wipeout

Teletext
RTL 5 offered a teletext service which stopped on 1 April 2017. The pages 888/889 are still available for subtitles.

References

External links

 

Television channels in the Netherlands
RTL Nederland
Television channels and stations established in 1993